The twenty-first season of Saturday Night Live, an American sketch comedy series, originally aired in the United States on NBC between September 30, 1995, and May 18, 1996.

History
SNL once again dodged cancellation from season 20's low ratings and scathing reviews about the show's decline in quality. The cast was mostly overhauled, new writers were brought in, and Beth McCarthy Miller took over as director.

The season was home to the Rage Against the Machine incident. On April 13, 1996, the band was the musical guest, and was scheduled to perform two songs. The show was hosted that night by ex-Republican presidential candidate and billionaire Steve Forbes. According to RATM guitarist Tom Morello, "RATM wanted to stand in sharp juxtaposition to a billionaire telling jokes and promoting his flat tax by making our own statement."
To this end, the band hung two upside-down American flags from their amplifiers. Seconds before they took the stage to perform "Bulls on Parade", SNL and NBC sent stagehands in to pull the flags down. Following the removal of the flags during the first performance, the band was approached by SNL and NBC officials and ordered to immediately leave the building. Upon hearing this, bassist Tim Commerford reportedly stormed Forbes's dressing room, throwing shreds from one of the torn down flags.
Morello noted that members of the Saturday Night Live cast and crew, whom he declined to name, "expressed solidarity with our actions, and a sense of shame that their show had censored the performance."

A new logo was used starting this season, consisting of the words SATURDAYNIGHTLIVE in a sans-serif typeface, and was used until 2006.

Cast
Before the start of the season, most of the cast had left or been fired from the show.

Only five cast members returned to the show from the previous season: Norm Macdonald, Mark McKinney, Tim Meadows, Molly Shannon, and David Spade. Although Spade returned to the show, he had more of a diminished role, very rarely appearing in sketches except for Spade in America, a "Weekend Update" segment hosted by Spade that debuted at the start of the season and was featured in all but five episodes. Shannon was upgraded to repertory status for this season.

Aside from Macdonald, McKinney, Meadows, Shannon, and Spade, the rest of the cast hired prior to the start of the season was entirely new. These included stand-up comedians Jim Breuer and Darrell Hammond; Groundlings alumni Will Ferrell and Cheri Oteri; and Chicago-based comedians Nancy Walls and David Koechner. Breuer, Hammond, Ferrell, Oteri, Koechner, and Walls were all promoted to repertory status upon being hired.

Ferrell and Oteri's fellow Groundling Chris Kattan, along with newly hired writer Colin Quinn, also joined as featured players for the final six episodes of the season. Fred Wolf was hired in April as a featured player.

Cast roster

Repertory players
Jim Breuer
Will Ferrell
Darrell Hammond
David Koechner
Norm Macdonald
Mark McKinney
Tim Meadows
Cheri Oteri
Molly Shannon
David Spade
Nancy Walls

Featured players
Chris Kattan (first episode: March 16, 1996)
Colin Quinn (first episode credited: March 16, 1996)
Fred Wolf (first episode: April 13, 1996)

bold denotes "Weekend Update" anchor

Writers

Steve Higgins, Adam McKay, Paula Pell, Frank Sebastiano, and Colin Quinn join the writing staff.

Episodes

References

21
Saturday Night Live in the 1990s
1995 American television seasons
1996 American television seasons
Television shows directed by Beth McCarthy-Miller